Eli Abarbanel (born 22 February 1976) is a retired Israeli footballer.

References

1976 births
Living people
Jewish Israeli sportspeople
Israeli footballers
Israel international footballers
Hapoel Petah Tikva F.C. players
Hapoel Haifa F.C. players
Bnei Yehuda Tel Aviv F.C. players
Liga Leumit players
Israeli Premier League players
Footballers from Petah Tikva
Israeli people of Turkish-Jewish descent
Association football defenders